Frederik Carl Gram Schrøder (19 July 1866 – 13 August 1936), usually referred to as F.C.G. Schrøder and also known as Fritz Schrøder was a Danish civil servant, Governor of Danmarks Nationalbank from 1925 and until his death.

In 1920 he served briefly as Minister of Justice in the Cabinet of M.P. Friis, a caretaker cabinet mainly consisting of civil servants which under the leadership of Michael Pedersen Friis was in office from 5 April to 5 May triggered by the Easter Crisis of 1920.

Private life
Schrøder was born in Copenhagen. His two sons were Henning Schrøder, who became director of the Ministry of Foreign Affairs, and Povl Schrøder, a painter. His daughter Karen Margrethe Schrøder married the architect, urban planner and writer Steen Eiler Rasmussen and was the mother of the linguist Una Canger.

References

Danish civil servants
1866 births
1936 deaths
Governors of the Bank of Denmark
Government ministers of Denmark
Politicians from Copenhagen